The 2009–10 Bundesliga was the 47th season of the Bundesliga, Germany's premier football league. The season commenced on 7 August 2009 with the traditional season-opening match involving the defending champions VfL Wolfsburg and VfB Stuttgart. The last games were played on 8 May 2010. There was a winter break between 21 December 2009 and 14 January 2010, though the period was reduced from six to three weeks.
The season was overshadowed by the suicide of Hannover 96 captain and goalkeeper Robert Enke on 10 November 2009.

Teams
Karlsruher SC and Arminia Bielefeld were directly relegated at the end of the 2008–09 season after finishing in the bottom two places of the table. Karlsruhe ended a two-year stint in Germany's top flight, while Arminia were relegated for the sixth time since the introduction of the Bundesliga, a current record, after five years.

The relegated teams were replaced by 2008–09 2. Bundesliga champions SC Freiburg and runners-up Mainz 05. Freiburg returned to the Bundesliga after four years, and Mainz began a second tenure in the top division after being relegated in the 2006–07 season.

A further place in the league was decided through a two-legged play-off. Energie Cottbus, as the 16th-placed Bundesliga team, had to face 1. FC Nürnberg, who finished third in 2. Bundesliga. Nürnberg won both matches by an aggregated score of 5–0 and thus earned their seventh promotion to the Bundesliga since its introduction, also a current record. Their opponents ended a second three-year top flight tenure and left the Bundesliga without a club from former East Germany for only the second time since East German teams were included before the 1991–92 season, with the other time being in 2005–06.

Stadia and locations
BayArena, home of Bayer Leverkusen, was expanded from 22,500 to 30,000 spectators during the first half of 2009. Other stadia which are recently undergoing renovation or expansion are Weserstadion in Bremen, HSH Nordbank Arena in Hamburg and Mercedes-Benz Arena in Stuttgart.

Notes
 Weserstadion will be increased in capacity during the season.
 HSH Nordbank Arena will be expanded to a capacity of 61,000 from January 2010.
 Mercedes-Benz Arena will be converted to a football-only stadium during the 2009–10 and 2010–11 seasons. As a consequence, the usual capacity of 58,000 is currently reduced to 42,101.

Personnel and sponsoring

Managerial changes
Eight teams underwent coaching changes during the off-season, among them champions VfL Wolfsburg and runners-up Bayern Munich. Christoph Daum made use of a unilateral contract option to terminate his contract at 1. FC Köln.

League table

Results

Relegation play-offs
16th-placed Bundesliga team 1. FC Nürnberg faced third-placed 2. Bundesliga team FC Augsburg for a two-legged play-off. The winner on aggregate score after both matches earned a spot in the 2010–11 Bundesliga. Nürnberg was participating in their second playoff in a row after winning promotion at the expense of Energie Cottbus in the playoff at the end of the 2008–09 season. The matches took place on 13 and 16 May, with Nürnberg playing at home first. Nürnberg won 3 – 0 on aggregate, thus retaining their spot in the Bundesliga for the next season.

Nürnberg won 3 – 0 on aggregate.

Statistics
Including matches played on 8 May 2010

Top scorers
Source: kicker.de

Awards

Player of the Month

Team of the Season

Champion squad

Note: Players without nationality denoted are German.

References

External links

 Official site 
 Bundesliga on DFB page 
 kicker magazine 

Bundesliga seasons
1
Germany